Franz Nießner (born 16 March 1957) is a German bobsledder. He competed at the 1984 Winter Olympics and the 1988 Winter Olympics.

References

1957 births
Living people
German male bobsledders
Olympic bobsledders of West Germany
Bobsledders at the 1984 Winter Olympics
Bobsledders at the 1988 Winter Olympics
Sportspeople from Garmisch-Partenkirchen